Park Forest Village is an unincorporated area and census-designated place (CDP) in Patton and Ferguson townships, Centre County, Pennsylvania, United States. It is part of the State College, Pennsylvania Metropolitan Statistical Area. The population was 8,831 at the 2020 census.

History
Park Forest Village, created in 1956, was the first large suburban development near State College. This neighborhood won several national awards for its design, which moved away from the straight streets and clear cutting typical of post World War II suburban developments. The use of gracefully curved streets and the retention of trees established a pattern for future developments everywhere.

Mr. Hawbaker's assistant designer was a noted architect/landscape architect Carl W. Wild, who insisted on focusing on street tree-plantings to define each street and maintaining as many naturally growing trees, as possible. Through their company, Park Forest Enterprises, they created the cul de sac and curved streets design of Park Forest Village which ended up yielding more housing units per square mile than the conventional city grid pattern. Park Forest Village also utilized several localized parks so that common recreation areas would be accessible to each neighborhood in the subdivision. The landscaping of each homesite also retained as many native trees on the original land as possible, giving each property abundant trees and a mature, long-term, lived in look as opposed to young sapling trees planted at the time most conventional homes were constructed that took years to grow and mature. As the building of the subdivision progressed, utility lines were buried so that telephone and power line poles became unnecessary, giving the streets a cleaner design and look. J. Alvin Hawbaker also pioneered the "Gallery of Homes" real estate marketing approach, which resulted in the sale of thousands of housing units within the area now known as Park Forest Village.

Geography
Park Forest Village is located in southern Centre County at  (40.801060, -77.909423). The eastern end of the community touches the northwestern corner of the borough of State College. The northern edge of the community is defined by U.S. Route 322 Business (North Atherton Street). The entire CDP is located within State College Area School District.

Demographics

As of the census of 2010, there were 9,660 people, 3,923 households, and 2,092 families residing in the CDP. The population density was 3,971.3 people per square mile (1,533.3/km). There were 4,029 housing units at an average density of 1,656.4/sq mi (639.6/km). The racial makeup of the CDP was 78.5% White, 3.8% Black or African American, 0.1% Native American, 10.8% Asian, 1.0% from other races, and 2.6% from two or more races. Hispanic or Latino of any race were 3.2% of the population.

There were 3,923 households, out of which 23.7% had children under the age of 18 living with them, 43.9% were married couples living together, 2.6% had a male householder with no wife present, 6.8% had a female householder with no husband present, and 46.7% were non-families. 24.0% of all households were made up of individuals, and 6.4% had someone living alone who was 65 years of age or older. The average household size was 2.45 and the average family size was 2.87.

In the CDP, the population was spread out, with 17.0% under the age of 18, 25.0% from 18 to 24, 26.0% from 25 to 44, 21.4% from 45 to 64, and 10.6% who were 65 years of age or older. The median age was 29 years. For every 100 females, there were 105.5 males. For every 100 females age 18 and over, there were 106.9 males.

The median income for a household in the CDP was $51,587, and the median income for a family was $74,675. The per capita income for the CDP was $29,387. About 13.0% of families and 22.9% of the population were below the poverty line.  However, traditional measures of income and poverty can be very misleading when applied to a community like Park Forest Village which is located only a few miles from Penn State University and has many student residents.

References

Census-designated places in Centre County, Pennsylvania
Census-designated places in Pennsylvania